Yiğitcan Hekimoğlu (born 27 April 1992) is a Turkish Cypriot sprinter who represents Turkey internationally. He won a silver medal in the 4 × 100 metres relay at the 2018 European Championships. In addition, he represented his country in the same event at the 2017 World Championships finishing seventh in the final.

International competitions

1Representing Europe

Personal bests
Outdoor
100 metres – 10.34 (-0.9 m/s, Erzurum 2018)
200 metres – 21.15 (+1.1 m/s, Bursa 2018)
Indoor
60 metres – 6.82 (Istanbul 2013)

References

1992 births
Living people
Turkish male sprinters
Mediterranean Games silver medalists for Turkey
Mediterranean Games medalists in athletics
Athletes (track and field) at the 2018 Mediterranean Games
Islamic Solidarity Games competitors for Turkey
Islamic Solidarity Games medalists in athletics